The 1949 Tour de Suisse was the 13th edition of the Tour de Suisse cycle race and was held from 30 July to 6 August 1949. The race started and finished in Zürich. The race was won by Gottfried Weilenmann.

General classification

References

1949
Tour de Suisse
Tour de Suisse